Gutierrezia californica is a North American species of flowering plant in the family Asteraceae known by the common names San Joaquin snakeweed and California matchweed. It is native to California and Arizona in the United States and Baja California in Mexico. It grows in sunny sandy or rocky areas in grasslands, scrub, or open woodlands.

This is a small subshrub reaching up to about half a meter (20 inches) in height. It grows clumpy or gangly and generally erect stems in shades of gray and red which are lined with small linear green leaves.

At the end of each branch of the stem is an inflorescence of one to three small flower heads just a few millimeters wide. The head contains several yellow disc florets with long, protruding styles and several yellow ray florets around the edge.

References

External links
 Calflora Database: Gutierrezia californica (California matchweed, San Joaquin snakeweed)
Jepson Manual eFlora (TJM2) treatment of Gutierrezia californica
United States Department of Agriculture Plants Profile
Calphotos Photo gallery, University of California

californica
Flora of California
Flora of Baja California
Plants described in 1836
Taxa named by Asa Gray
Taxa named by John Torrey
Flora without expected TNC conservation status